Konstantinos Orfanos (Greek: Κωνσταντίνος Ορφανός; born 22 August 1956) is a retired Greek footballer.

Career
He started his career at PAOK in 1975. He was a part of the team that won the Alpha Ethniki championship in 1976. In 1980, Orfanos joined PAOK's rivals Olympiacos winning three more championships in 1981, 1982 and 1983. He played for them until the summer of 1985 when he returned to PAOK. He ended his career in 1989 at Apollon Kalamarias. He played 394 league games. He earned 8 caps for the Greece national football team.

Personal
His brother is the politician Georgios Orfanos and his son is Dimitrios Orfanos. Orfanos family has roots from Agia Triada Evrytania.

Honours
PAOK
 Alpha Ethniki: 1975–76

Olympiacos
 Alpha Ethniki: 1980–81, 1981–82, 1982–83
 Greek Cup: 1980–81

References

External links
Κώστας Ορφανός: «Διαμάντι» στο στέμμα του ΠΑΟΚ

1956 births
Living people
Greek footballers
Greece international footballers
Association football forwards
PAOK FC players
Olympiacos F.C. players
Apollon Pontou FC players
Super League Greece players
Footballers from Thessaloniki